Darby Pop Publishing is an American comic book publishing company founded in 2013 by film writer and producer Jeff Kline. Sixteen original series and 100+ issues/TPs have been published to date. Creators have included Eric Garcia (City: The Mind in the Machine), John Raffo (The 7th Sword), Scott Marder/Rob Rosell/Jack Lambert (Doberman), Matthew Federman & Stephen Scaia (Dead Squad), and Kline himself (Indestructible).

In July 2015, Darby Pop partnered with Magnetic Press and released Side-Kicked by Russell Brettholtz, Dead Man's Party by Jeff Marsick, Fake Empire by Eric Palicki, The Living Finger by Garth Matthams, and Sweet Lullaby by A.J. Scherkenbach.

In October 2015, Darby Pop announced a collaboration with Bruce Lee Entertainment to produce Bruce Lee: The Dragon Rises, which chronicles the return of the beloved actor, philosopher, teacher, and — of course — martial artist in a present-day, all-ages comedy/action/adventure. In January 2018, Darby Pop announced another collaboration with Bruce Lee Entertainment: Bruce Lee: The Walk of the Dragon by Nicole Dubuc (Star Wars: Rebels, My Little Pony, Transformers: Rescue Bots).

In 2017, Darby Pop Publishing went independent and over the next two years released Things You Shouldn't Remember by Luis Roldan, Bastard's Waltz by Mark Bertolini, Santa Claus: Private Eye by Jeremy Bernstein, and Frank N. Stein: Private Eye by Keith Champagne.

Titles

Indestructible

The satire Indestructible was created and originally written by Darby Pop founder Jeff Kline (Transformers: Prime, G.I. Joe: Renegades) before Ken Kristensen took over writing duties on issue #5. Indestructible is a tale of mistaken secret identity, centering on everyman Greg Pincus, who is mistakenly believed to be super-powered and immediately vaulted into celebrity-dom.

City: The Mind in the Machine

City: The Mind in the Machine was created by Eric Garcia (Matchstick Men, Anonymous Rex). City follows Ben Fischer, who helped build the world's most advanced surveillance system, "Golden Shield", which utilizes every camera, cell phone, and computer in San Francisco to battle crime. Unfortunately, Golden Shield operates in black and white, unable to prioritize threats or distinguish true danger amidst a sea of false alarms. In other words, the program can't properly function without a human mind to operate it. Against his will, Ben Fischer is chosen to be that “mind”, resulting in a controversial melding of man and machine.

The 7th Sword

The 7th Sword was created by John Raffo (Dragon: The Bruce Lee Story). Daniel Cray—a Samurai mercenary—stumbles upon the legendary city of ZenZion, a mysterious desert outpost currently under siege from a vicious Warlord. The peace-loving citizenry beg Cray to train them in exchange for passage back to Earth, but their battle is a hopeless one: six fresh recruits versus a relentless army of robots, hybrids, and their savage masters.

Doberman

Doberman is a comedic series about a ″roundhouse-kicking, beer-shotgunning, Dodge Stealth–driving badass with a badge.″ It was created by Rob Rosell and Scott Marder (It's Always Sunny in Philadelphia, Unsupervised), and Jack Lambert. Frank “Doberman” Doberano is a 1980s cop who is forced to function in a modern-day police department in order to avenge his partner's death and take down his nemesis.

Dead Squad

Dead Squad relates the tale of three U.S. military operatives who are murdered by their own commanding officer after completing a questionable mission. Thanks to experimental nanotechnology, each is granted a 36-hour reprieve to track their killer and change their ultimate fate (heaven or hell). Dead Squad was created by Matt Federman and Stephen Scaia (Jericho, Warehouse 13).

Indestructible: Stingray

It's tough enough being a mutant teenager, but imagine the challenges when you're also surrounded by role models driven wholly by power, money, fame, and antagonism. (No, not the Kardashians.) Kelly, a.k.a. Stingray, finds herself the newest member of the League of Defenders, America's premiere super team, and most dysfunctional “family.” Will Stingray be able to navigate the choppy waters, or will they swallow her whole?

Dead Squad: Ayala Tal
From the pages of DEAD SQUAD, the spotlight is finally shone on the mystery and history of Ayala Tal. Who is this sensual and savage killer? What does she want? And why? Scribes Matthew Federman and Stephen Scaia answer these questions (and more), and lay the groundwork for what's to come for the “Dead Squad.”

Side-Kicked

Side-Kicked, created by Russell Brettholtz and Miguel Mendonca, is a superhero satire about what happens when Chicago's five most loyal sidekicks finally grow tired of being disrespected by both the prima donnas they work for and the citizenry they strike to protect and go on strike. Side-Kicked was the first comic published under Darby Pop's partnership with Magnetic Press.

Dead Man's Party

Created by Jeff Marsick and Scott Barnett. In the assassin trade, a Dead Man's Party is part Viking funeral, part Irish wake, a twisted way for your murderous peers to either honor your memory or settle a score.  Each of the five professional killers who participate have 30 days to collect the bounty on your head, adding your distinguished name to his or her resume. And the "contract" is wholly irrevocable. For the world's most feared executioner – known only as Ghost – arranging such a Party for himself is a last resort, a way to go out on his own terms and at the top of his game.

Fake Empire

Created by Eric Palicki. Fairies have always existed in secret, without a kingdom of their own, living side-by-side with humankind. But when one of his own children is murdered, King Oberon asks his surviving daughters – newly minted NYPD detective Charli and wingless black sheep Lucy – to find her killer amidst the citizenry of New York. As Charli and Lucy delve deeper into the mystery, they begin to discover the extraordinary measures their father has taken – some clever, some desperate – to keep an entire people hidden in an increasingly treacherous world. For Charlie and Lucy, unmasking their sister's executioner will mean confronting their own blood-drenched legacy.

Bruce Lee: The Dragon Rises

Bruce Lee never died. And he hasn't aged. But, he has no idea who he is, what's happened in the world in the past 40+ years, or why so many “thugs” want a piece of him. With the help of a fly BFF from the ’70s – Joe Toomey, P.I. – and a pair of precocious Teens, Bruce will piece together a mystery more insidious than ever imagined, and find himself forced to do battle with both an enigmatic Villain and his very own conscience. In other words, the Dragon rises… and “walks on” once more! Written by Bruce Lee's daughter, Shannon Lee, and Jeff Kline.

The Living Finger

When well-meaning Jason discovers a disembodied finger that appears to “alive,” it quickly becomes the sole focus of his life. He names the digit “Wendy,” learns to communicate with it via “tap code,” and discovers that the one thing Wendy wants more than anything else is a living, breathing human body to attach to. But, as soon as Jason helps Wendy secure an unwitting “host,” problems arise. Soon, Jason has collected a bathtub full of corpses, a rightly suspicious sister, and a best friend hellbent on selling Wendy to the highest bidder. Even worse, Jason is beginning to realize that he may have acted a bit rashly, especially with Wendy proudly displaying an unhealthy fascination with knives. Is there any way for Jason to set things right without becoming another casualty?

Women of Darby Pop

The Women of Darby Pop is a specially-priced, double-sized floppy collecting short stories written and drawn by the winners of Darby Pop Publishing's second “Breaking Into Comics” contest. This unique anthology shines a spotlight on both major and minor female characters from nearly every book Darby Pop has published to date while simultaneously introducing readers to a wellspring of new talent.

Sweet Lullaby

Lullaby is a strong-willed, 2nd-generation covert assassin, viewing the world through a black and white lens.  Typically, she adopts a new look and identity for each mission before moving-in next door to a potential target, and presenting herself as a friendly (or troubled or sexy or mysterious) neighbor. But, upon receiving orders to “terminate,” Lullaby does so with clever — and sadistic — precision.  Now, Lullaby is mired in a “gray area”; she must choose whether to remain a government-sanctioned killer or walk away for love.  That is, of course, assuming the choice will be hers to make.

Things You Shouldn't Remember

Dozens of people from all across the United States suddenly find themselves recalling random things: song lyrics, places, and events that seem to have been erased from both collective memory and recorded history. Fearing the spread of a virus-like plague, a mysterious group known as “The Handlers” is tasked with hunting and destroying those who recollect. But, does the end justify the means? And what if you were the one whose mind was unwittingly filled with things you shouldn't remember? Things You Shouldn't Remember serves up a cocktail of adventure, horror, and humor in a story that will keep you guessing... and make you wonder if your own memories should be trusted.

Bastard's Waltz

John the Bastard is the world's most dangerous supervillain; his name alone has struck fear into the hearts of most heroes for decades.  But now John finds himself in the crosshairs of a talented upstart, and only Secret Service protection specialist Ezekiel Sweet can keep John safe from the swarm of psychopaths heading his way. With Sweet a reluctant guardian, a traitor in their midst, and John's skills markedly slipping, who will survive the ultimate showdown?

Santa Claus: Private Eye

One day each year, Santa Claus brings presents to children all over the world. The other 364, he moonlights as Nick Santana, a down-on-his-luck detective, trying to make his way in the lonely city. Instead of his red and white suit, Nick sports a trenchcoat and fedora. Instead of the North Pole, Nick works dark corners and rain-slicked streets filled with gangster, guns and – of course — femme fatales. ‘Cuz no one knows better than Santa Claus that the nicer they look, the naughtier they can be.

Bruce Lee: The Walk of the Dragon

Philosopher/teacher/real-life superhero Bruce Lee is back. And, let's be honest, the world needs him now more than ever. Taking a brief respite from battling an otherworldly evil, Bruce Lee attempts to navigate modern-day Southern California despite still suffering from amnesia and having been “out of the loop” for over 45 years. Unfortunately, what was supposed to be a simple “lunch run” soon turns into a comedy of errors involving mistaken identity, a Film Festival,” and the pokey. And despite never being one to initiate fisticuffs, Bruce continues to find it difficult to both hide his martial arts skills – and keep his shirt on.

Frank N. Stein: Private Eye

Frank N. Stein has the face of a monster, the brain of an inquisitor, and the soul of a poet. Currently, Frank ekes out a living as a private dick on the streets of Monstertown, a place where all the fictional characters in the world co-exist. Whether you're a fairy tale princess, a superhero, or a mythical beast, everyone has a secret. And for a few dollars and a milkshake, Frank N. Stein just might be willing to unlock yours.

References

External links
 Previews World: "Darby Pop, Fueled and Indestructible." 
 Comics Beat: "Interview: David Wohl and Jason Enright Unveil Darby Pop Publishing."
 Darby Pop Publishing

Comic book publishing companies of the United States